USS Southampton has been the name of two ships of the United States Navy.

 , a side wheel steamer, laid down in 1841, which served from 1845 until 1855

United States Navy ship names